Baqu Arena is an indoor sporting arena located in Harbin, China.  The capacity of the arena is 5,000 people.  It was the main arena used during the 2008 Women's World Ice Hockey Championships.

External links
IIHF website
Trip to China has been an adventure for Canadian women

Ice hockey in China
Indoor arenas in China
Indoor ice hockey venues
Sports venues in Heilongjiang